Mohamed Hussein Curka (born 23 June 1997) is a Somali footballer who currently plays for Onsala.

Club career
Hussein made 13 appearances for Neutrala IF in the Swedish Division 5, before joining Onsala.

International career
Hussein was called up to the Somalia national football team in March 2022 for 2023 Africa Cup of Nations qualification.

Career statistics

Club

Notes

International

References

1997 births
Living people
Association football defenders
Somalian footballers
Somalia international footballers
Division 5 (Swedish football) players
Somalian expatriate footballers
Expatriate footballers in Sweden